The men's doubles bowling competitions at the 2019 Pan American Games in Lima, Peru were held between 25 and 27 July 2019.

Schedule 
All times are in Peru Time (UTC-5).

Results

Source: 

Notes

References 

Bowling at the 2019 Pan American Games